Jeffrey W. Byrd is an American film director, producer and screenwriter. Once a protégé of Spike Lee, Byrd started his film career by working on several of Lee's films including Mo' Better Blues, Malcolm X and Jungle Fever. Byrd  directed more than one hundred music videos and numerous television commercials as well as feature films such as Jasper Texas, Seventeen Again and King's Ransom. His  film project, A Beautiful Soul, was in post-production and scheduled for release in 2012.

Byrd is a native of Brooklyn, New York.

Filmography

References

External links
 

African-American film directors
African-American film producers
African-American screenwriters
Screenwriters from New York (state)
Film producers from New York (state)
American music video directors
American male screenwriters
Living people
People from Brooklyn
Year of birth missing (living people)
Film directors from New York City
21st-century African-American people
African-American male writers